Shakr-un-Nissa Begum (died 1 January 1653) was a Mughal princess, the daughter of Emperor Akbar.

Early life
Shakr-un-Nissa Begum was born at Fatehpur Sikri, to Akbar and Bibi Daulat Shad. She had a younger full sister named Aram Banu Begum.

Shakr-un-Nissa was brought up in Akbar's care and turned out to be very well, good-natured, and innately compassionate towards all people. Jahangir had a constant love for her.

Marriage
In 1594, Akbar arranged her marriage with Shahrukh Mirza. He was the son of Ibrahim Mirza, the son of Sulaiman Mirza of Badakshan and Haram Begum. His mother was Muhtarima Khanum, the daughter of Shah Muhammad Sultan Jagatai and Khadija Sultan Khanum, daughter of Ahmad Alaq. The marriage took place on 2 September 1594 in the quarters of Empress Hamida Banu Begum.

Shahrukh Mirza was also married to Shakr-un-Nissa's cousin, Kabuli Begum, the daughter of her uncle Mirza Muhammad Hakim.

Shakr-un-Nissa became a widow, after Shahrukh Mirza's death in 1607. He died leaving four sons, Hasan Mirza and Husayn Mirza, who were twins, Sultan Mirza, and Badi-uz-Zaman Mirza, and three daughters.

After the death of Akbar in the year 1605, she exercised her influence over her brother Jahangir and aided her stepmothers Mariam-uz-Zamani and Salima Sultan Begum to secure a pardon for the Khusrau Mirza, the eldest son of Jahangir.

Death
Shakr-un-Nissa Begum died on 1 January 1653. She had started from Akbarabad towards Shahjahanabad. She was buried in her father's mausoleum, located at Sikandra.

References

Mughal princesses
Timurid princesses
Year of birth unknown
1653 deaths
Mughal nobility
Timurid dynasty
17th-century Indian Muslims
Indian female royalty
16th-century Indian women
16th-century Indian people
17th-century Indian women
Women of the Mughal Empire
Indian princesses
Daughters of emperors